A list of films produced in Hong Kong in 1969:.

1969

References

External links
IMDB list of Hong Kong films
Hong Kong films of 1969 at HKcinemamagic.com

1969
Lists of 1969 films by country or language
1969 in Hong Kong